The Champaign–Urbana Sessions is an album of studio sessions and rehearsals by the band King Crimson, released through the King Crimson Collectors' Club in December 2002. These were originally intended for their album Three of a Perfect Pair, but the material was scrapped and the group would re-convene at several later dates. On (and off) The Road (1981–1984) included this disc along with two new tracks, under the new title Fragmented.

Content
The tracks "Yoli Yoli" and "Adrian and Robert" were added for release on On (and off) The Road in 2016. "Yoli Yoli" is a complete song with lyrics that reference "Waiting Man" from Beat. "Adrian And Robert" was previously included on another King Crimson Collectors' Club disc, Rehearsals & Blows. The previously released version is shorter than the cut from On (and off) The Road by about four minutes.

Several motifs from the 14 tracks (16 on the On (and off) The Road box set) would later resurface on the final 9 tracks of Three of a Perfect Pair. For example, "Adrian and Robert" is a lengthy improvisation additionally featuring Bill Bruford. The rhythm guitar played on this song would be reused as part of "Sleepless", and the drum track resembles "Nuages (That Which Passes, Passes Like Clouds)". "Fragmented" would become "Industry", and Robert Fripp uses a guitar phrase that would become the introduction for "Larks' Tongues in Aspic, Part III" on "Robert and Bill".

Otherwise, there is completely scrapped material. Tracks 1-4, 6-8, and 10-15 do not closely resemble anything on Three of a Perfect Pair. "Robert's Ballad", along with five other songs not present on this disc, was included on the 40th Anniversary edition of Three of a Perfect Pair, with "Robert's Ballad" receiving a new 5.1 mix. "San Francisco" and "Heat in the Jungle" both reference previous King Crimson songs, "Neurotica" and "Thela Hun Ginjeet", respectively. "Neurotica" was originally known as "Manhattan" and "Thela Hun Ginjeet" is an anagram of the phrase "heat in the jungle".

Track listing 

Music by Adrian Belew, Bill Bruford, Robert Fripp, and Tony Levin, unless otherwise indicated.

Personnel
 Robert Fripp - guitar
 Adrian Belew - guitar
 Tony Levin - bass guitar, Chapman stick
 Bill Bruford - drums

References

King Crimson Collector's Club albums
2002 albums